Abayakoon is a Sinhalese surname.

Notable people
 Dimuthu Bandara Abayakoon (born 1971), Sri Lankan politician
 S. B. S. Abayakoon (born 1958), Sri Lankan academic

See also
 

Sinhalese surnames